Kangon is the name of several places in Burma:

Kangon (24°35"N 95°40"E), Banmauk Township, Sagaing Region
Kangon (24°2"N 95°29"E), Banmauk Township, Sagaing Region
Kangon (24°20"N 95°55"E), Banmauk Township, Sagaing Region
Kangon (24°20"N 95°52"E), Banmauk Township, Sagaing Region